Kouts School is a public K-12 school located in Kouts, Indiana.

See also
 List of high schools in Indiana

References

External links
 Official Website

Buildings and structures in Porter County, Indiana